Phenthoate is an organothiophosphate insecticide.  It is used against Lepidoptera, jassids, aphids, soft scales, mosquitoes, blowflies, houseflies, and ked.

References

External links 
 

Organothiophosphate esters
Insecticides